Bengt Jönsson (born 24 December 1955) is a Swedish former swimmer. He competed in the men's 400 metre freestyle at the 1976 Summer Olympics.

References

External links
 

1955 births
Living people
Swedish male freestyle swimmers
Olympic swimmers of Sweden
Swimmers at the 1976 Summer Olympics
People from Storuman Municipality
Sportspeople from Västerbotten County